William King (1 May 1650 – 8 May 1729) was an Anglican divine in the Church of Ireland, who was Archbishop of Dublin from 1703 to 1729. He was an author and supported the Glorious Revolution. He had considerable political influence in Ireland, including a veto on judicial appointments.

Early life
King was born in May 1650 in County Antrim, to James King and his wife; his parents were recent immigrants from Aberdeen. He was educated at The Royal School, Dungannon, County Tyrone, and thereafter at Trinity College Dublin, graduating BA on 23 February 1670 and MA in 1673.

Career
On 25 October 1671, King was ordained a deacon as chaplain to John Parker, Archbishop of Tuam, and on 14 July 1673 Parker gave him the prebend of Kilmainmore, County Mayo. King, who lived as part of Parker's household, was ordained a priest on 12 April 1674.

His support of the Glorious Revolution in 1688 served to advance his position. He became Bishop of Derry in 1691. He was advanced to the position of Archbishop of Dublin in 1703, a post he would hold until his death. He gave £1,000 for the founding of "Archbishop King's Professorship of Divinity" at Trinity College in 1718. Much of his correspondence survives and provides a historic resource for the study of the Ireland of his time. He died in May 1729.

King's years as a bishop were marked by reform and the building of churches and glebe houses, and by the dispensing of charity. He was generally regarded as a man of sense and good judgment, and his political influence was considerable: he was always consulted on judicial appointments and at times seems to have had an effective veto over candidates he considered unsuitable. His influence declined after the appointment of Hugh Boulter as Archbishop of Armagh in 1724, as Boulter was also consulted on judicial appointments, and the two could rarely agree on a suitable candidate.

Boulter's preferment to the See of Armagh, passing over his own more obvious claims, was a bitter disappointment to King. He took petty revenge at their first meeting by refusing to get up from his chair, saying that he was too old to stand; he might reasonably have pointed out instead that he was a martyr to gout, from which he had suffered for forty years and from which he died five 
years later. He was a vocal opponent of Wood's halfpence during the 1720s.

After King's death, Bishop Theophilus Bolton purchased 6,000 of King's books to establish the Bolton Library in Cashel, County Tipperary.

Works
As a man of letters he wrote The State of the Protestants in Ireland under King James's Government in 1691 and De Origine Mali in 1702, translated into English with extensive notes by Edmund Law in 1731 as An Essay on the Origin of Evil; it was also subject to a well-known critical discussion by Gottfried Wilhelm Leibniz, published as an appendix to Leibniz's Théodicée.

References

Further reading 
 C. S. King, ed. A great Archbishop of Dublin, William King, D.D., 1650-1729: His autobiography, family, and a selection from his correspondence; 1906, Longman,Green.
 Philip O'Regan; Archbishop William King, 1650-1729 and the Constitution in Church and State; 2000, Four Courts Press, .
 Robert S. Matteson, A large private park: the collection of Archbishop William King 1650–1729. Cambridge: LP Publications, 2003. (Libri Pertinentes, no. 7) 2 vols ; co-published with Tempe (Arizona): Arizona Center for Medieval and Renaissance Studies, 2003. 
 Fauske, Christopher, ed. Archbishop William King and the Anglican Irish Context, 1688-1729; 2004, Four Courts Press, .
 Fauske, Christopher, A Political Biography of William King; 2011, Chatto and Pickering, .

1650 births
1729 deaths
People from County Antrim
Alumni of Trinity College Dublin
Anglican bishops of Derry
Anglican archbishops of Dublin
Fellows of the Royal Society
Members of the Privy Council of Ireland
Members of the Irish House of Lords
17th-century Irish Anglican priests
18th-century Irish Anglican priests
Burials at Donnybrook Cemetery
Irish Anglican archbishops